UHID may refer to:

 Bell UH-1 Iroquois, a military helicopter
 U-HID (Ultra High Intensity Discharge), a type of lamp
 Universal Healthcare Identifier, see ASTM E 1714
 It is an abbreviation for Universal Human Interface Device.   It is a circuit board & a keyboard replacement for MAME Emulation cabinets.